Herbert Stanley Foster (August 9, 1913 – June 2, 2003) was a Canadian professional ice hockey player who played six games in the National Hockey League with the New York Rangers, five games in 1940 and one game in 1948. The rest of his career, which lasted from 1932 to 1950, was mainly spent in the Eastern Amateur Hockey League.

Career statistics

Regular season and playoffs

External links
 

1913 births
2003 deaths
Atlantic City Sea Gulls (EHL) players
Canadian expatriate ice hockey players in the United States
Canadian ice hockey left wingers
Cleveland Barons (1937–1973) players
Ice hockey people from Ontario
New York Rangers players
New York Rovers players
Ontario Hockey Association Senior A League (1890–1979) players
Philadelphia Ramblers players
Pittsburgh Hornets players
Shawinigan-Falls Cataracts (QSHL) players
Sportspeople from Brockville
Washington Lions players